The Fujisankei Ladies Classic is an annual golf event on the LPGA of Japan Tour. It was first played in 1982. The tournament was held at the Fivehundred Club in Shizuoka from 1982 to 1995 then at the Fujizakura CC from 1996 to 2003. In 2004 the venue was the Fuji Lakeside CC. The Kawana Hotel's Fuji course is the host since 2005. The prize fund in 2021 was ¥80,000,000, with ¥14,400,000 going to the winner. The title sponsor is the Fujisankei Communications Group.

Winners 
2022 Sayaka Takahashi 
2021 Mone Inami
2020 Cancelled
2019 Jiyai Shin
2018 Saki Nagamine
2017 Yumiko Yoshida
2016 Shiho Oyama
2015 Hikari Fujita
2014 Phoebe Yao
2013 Miki Saiki
2012 Kaori Ohe
2011 Kumiko Kaneda
2010 Mayu Hattori
2009 Tamie Durdin
2008 Ayako Uehara
2007 Miki Saeki
2006 Shiho Oyama
2005 Kasumi Fujii
2004 Kasumi Fujii
2003 Ikuyo Shiotani
2002 Ok-Hee Ku
2001 Miyuki Shimabukuro
2000 Mayumi Hirase
1999 Midori Yoneyama
1998 Masako Ishihara
1997 Aki Takamura
1996 Ayako Okamoto
1995 Junko Yasui
1994 Yueh-chyn Huang
1993 Sheree Smail
1992 Ayako Okamoto
1991 Norimi Teresawa
1990 Mayumi Hirase
1989 Erika Nakajima
1988 Junko Yasui
1987 Cindy Rarick
1986 Atsuko Hikage
1985 Ai-Yu Tu
1984 Hiromi Takamura
1983 Tatsuko Ohsako
1982 Hiroko Kobayashi

External links
Tournament home page - in Japanese

LPGA of Japan Tour events
Golf tournaments in Japan
1982 establishments in Japan
Recurring sporting events established in 1982